Kök-Aygyr is a settlement in Naryn Region of Kyrgyzstan. It is situated in the valley east of lake Chatyr-Kul.

References

Populated places in Naryn Region